Ennio Balbo (18 April 1922 – 18 June 1989) was an Italian film, television and voice actor.

Biography
Born in Naples,  Balbo made his debut on stage immediately after the Second World War alongside Paola Borboni and Lamberto Picasso in Luigi Pirandello's Così è se vi pare. He was later a member of the theater company of Gino Cervi, as well as one of the members of the "Society of the Four" alongside Valeria Moriconi, Lia Zoppelli and Gianni Agus. He was also very active as a character actor in films, mainly in villain roles; Balbo took part to numerous Spaghetti Western films in which he was usually credited as Edward Bell. Balbo appeared in over 45 films between 1958 and 1988. He appeared in an episode of the short-lived 1974 ABC police drama Nakia, credited as Edward Bell.

Selected filmography

 Audace colpo dei soliti ignoti (1959) - Poliziotto calvo (voice, uncredited)
 The Police Commissioner (1962)
 A Queen for Caesar (1962) - Theodoto
 Catherine of Russia (1963) - count Panin
 Corruption (1963)
 Casanova 70 (1965) - Il giudice
 Terror-Creatures from the Grave (1965) - Oskar Stinner - The paralytic 
 The Possessed (1965) - Coroner
 Agent 077 From the Orient with Fury (1965) - Professor Franz Kurtz
 Seven Golden Men (1965) - Police Chief
 Kiss the Other Sheik (1965) - Brother of Mohamed (segment "L'uomo dei 5 palloni") (uncredited)
 Seven Golden Men Strike Again (1966) - Police Chief
 Spies Strike Silently (1966)
 Pardon, Are You For or Against? (1966)
 Master Stroke (1967) - Doctor
 Da Berlino l'apocalisse (1967) - Papillon
 Day of Anger (1967) - Turner - Banker
 Two Faces of the Dollar (1967) - Gunsmith (uncredited)
 Qualcuno ha tradito (1967)
 The Day of the Owl (1968) - First Mafioso at the Banquet
 Gunman Sent by God (1968) - Thomas Clerigen
 Sardinia Kidnapped (1968) - Marras
 The Man with the Balloons (1968)
 The Black Sheep (1968) - Father-in-law of Agasti
 Gatling Gun (1968) - Richard Gatling
 The Appointment (1969) - Ugo Perino
 Giacomo Casanova: Childhood and Adolescence (1969) - Mocenigo
 Django the Bastard (1969) - Storekeeper (uncredited)
 Rendezvous with Dishonour (1970) - Chief of Police
 Ninì Tirabusciò: la donna che inventò la mossa (1970) - General
 The Adventures of Pinocchio (1972) - Alidoro (voice)
 The Great Kidnapping (1973) - Prefetto
 Anna: the Pleasure, the Torment (1973) - Frossi
 Anno uno (1974) - Nenni
 How to Kill a Judge (1975) - Il giudice istruttore
 Il fidanzamento (1975) - Monsignor Solinas
 The Left Hand of the Law (1975) - Lombardi
 Hallucination Strip (1975) - Antiquario
 Street People (1976) - Continenza
 Bestialità (1976)
 Star Odyssey (1979) - Professor Mauri
 Saremo felici (1989)

References

External links

1922 births
1989 deaths
Italian male film actors
Italian male stage actors
Italian male voice actors
Italian male television actors
20th-century Italian male actors
Male actors from Naples
Burials at Campo Verano